Liji North Road Station is a station on Line 1 of the Wuhan Metro. It entered revenue service along with the completion of Line 1, Phase 1 on July 28, 2004. It is located in Qiaokou District.

The station has a flyover to Wuhan International Square.

Station layout

Transfers
Bus transfers to Route 47, 69, 291, 519, 575, 592, 622, 703, 705 and 726 are available at Liji North Road Station.

References

Wuhan Metro stations
Line 1, Wuhan Metro
Railway stations in China opened in 2004